Abnormal is the seventh studio album by recording artist Ron "Bumblefoot" Thal, released in July 2008. Abnormal is Thal's first solo release as a member of Guns N' Roses.

Thal described Abnormal as "..a continuation of a very personal tale. If Normal was the first chapter, then Abnormal is the second chapter of the same book. It's a tale of how my life has been 3 years after Normal, after touring with Guns N' Roses and [everything else]". The songs "Abnormal", "Glad to Be Here" and "Objectify" were performed by Thal as solo spots in Guns N' Roses concerts. "Objectify" was featured as Thal's solo in Appetite for Democracy 3D. Thal mentioned "Green" being one of his favorite songs he's ever written.

Track listing

Personnel
 Ron "Bumblefoot" Thal - guitars, vocals
 Dennis Leeflang – drums
 Mike McVicker – tuba
 Swashbuckle, Dennis Leeflang, Brian Larkin, Natalie Kikkenborg, Erin Bailey – backing vocals

References

2008 albums
Ron "Bumblefoot" Thal albums